Spencer Clark may refer to:

Spencer M. Clark. first Superintendent of the National Currency Bureau, today known as the Bureau of Engraving and Printing
Spencer Clark (racing driver), racecar driver
Spencer Treat Clark, actor
Spencer Clark (musician), jazz saxophonist
Spencer Clark, indie musician noted for his influence on hypnagogic pop
 Spencer Clark, Canadian responsible for Guild Park and Gardens artist colony and heritage building conservatory